IEEE Internet Award is a Technical Field Award established by the IEEE in June 1999. The award is sponsored by Nokia Corporation.  It may be presented annually to an individual or up to three recipients, for exceptional contributions to the advancement of Internet technology for network architecture, mobility and/or end-use applications. Awardees receive a bronze medal, certificate, and honorarium.

The following people have received the award:

 2000 – Paul Baran, Donald W. Davies, Leonard Kleinrock and Larry Roberts (for packet switching)
 2001 – Louis Pouzin (for datagrams)
 2002 – Steve Crocker (for approach enabling evolution of Internet Protocols)
 2003 – Paul Mockapetris (the Mockapetris citation specifically cites Jon Postel who had died and therefore could not receive the award for their DNS work) (for the domain name system)
 2004 – Raymond Tomlinson and David H. Crocker (for networked email)
 2005 – Sally Floyd (for contributions in congestion control, traffic modeling, and active queue management)
 2006 – Scott Shenker (for contributions to the study of resource sharing)
 2007 – not awarded
 2008 – Mike Brecia, Ginny Travers, and Bob Hinden (for early routers)
 2009 – Lixia Zhang (for Internet architecture and modeling)
 2010 – Stephen Deering (for IP multicasting and IPv6)
 2011 – Jun Murai (for leadership in the development of the global Internet, especially in Asia)
 2012 – Mark Handley (for exceptional contributions to the advancement of Internet technology for network architecture, mobility, and/or end-use applications)
 2013 – David L. Mills (for significant leadership and sustained contributions in the research, development, standardization, and deployment of quality time synchronization capabilities for the Internet)
 2014 – Jon Crowcroft (for contributions to research in and teaching of Internet protocols, including multicast, transport, quality of service, security, mobility, and opportunistic networking)
 2015 – KC Claffy and Vern Paxson (for seminal contributions to the field of Internet measurement, including security and network data analysis, and for distinguished leadership in and service to the Internet community by providing open-access data and tools)
 2016 – Henning Schulzrinne
 2017 – Deborah Estrin
 2018 – Ramesh Govindan
 2019 – Jennifer Rexford
 2020 – Stephen Casner and Eve Schooler (for contributions to Internet multimedia standards and protocols)
 2023 – Ian Foster and Carl Kesselman (for contributions to the design, deployment, and application of practical Internet-scale global computing platforms)

See also 

 List of computer science awards
Internet Hall of Fame
Internet pioneers

References

External links 

Internet Award
Computer science awards
Awards established in 1999